The Battle of Mayoyao Ridge was a battle of the Philippines campaign of 1944–1945 during World War II. 

From July 26, to August 9, 1945, Filipino soldiers of the 11th Infantry Regiment, United States Army Forces in the Philippines – Northern Luzon, under the command of Donald Blackburn, supported by airstrikes by Army Air Forces, captured the Japanese stronghold of Mayoyao, Ifugao in Northern Luzon.

Historical marker 

The memorial or historical marker, located at Mount Nagchajan in Mayoyao, Ifugao, marks the site of the “Battle of Mayoyao Ridge”. The battle was fought between the Japanese Imperial forces and the combined Filipino and American soldiers, towards the end of World War II. The result was key to the eventual surrender of General Yamashita at Kiangan, Ifugao.

References

1945 in the Philippines
Military history of the Philippines during World War II
Mayoyao Ridge
Mayoyao Ridge
Mayoyao Ridge